Turība University (formerly known as the Turība School of Business Administration) is the largest business school in Latvia. The university was established in 1993. It has three branches located in Liepāja, Cēsis, and Talsi.

Faculties 
The university consists of four faculties with main study directions – business administration, law, international tourism, and communication. It runs a total of 25 study programmes, which include Professional Bachelors Program, Professional Masters Program and Doctoral study program.

 Faculty of Business Administration (dean - Zane Drinke, Dr.oec., professor)
 Faculty of Law (dean - Jānis Načisčionis, Dr.iur., Assoc. professor)
 Faculty of International Tourism (dean - Agita Doniņa, MBA., lecturer) 
 Faculty of Communication (dean - Andris Pētersons, Mg.hist., Dr.sc.soc., Assoc. professor)

International action 

The professional bachelor study programme Management of Tourism and Hospitality Companies and the professional master study programme Tourism Strategic Management have obtained the WTO TedQual certificate - accreditation of the United Nations World Tourism Organization (UNWTO). Turiba has become the first higher education institution in the Baltic region and Scandinavian countries to receive accreditation by the UNWTO and a high evaluation by internationally recognised experts.
The school is an active member of University Network of the European Capitals of Culture (UNeECC)  and has been admitted as a member in the AACSB International, the Association to Advance Collegiate Schools of Business, which unites the leading higher educational institutions of business, in EURASHE - European Association of Institutions of Higher Education and ELFA, European Law Faculties Association. In addition, Turiba University offers students an opportunity to study in 65 partner universities as part of ERASMUS + study mobility program.

Notable alumni

Notable alumni include:
 Ilona Marhele, women's marathon runner, participant of the 2016 Summer Olympics; 
 Ilona Jurševska former Minister of Welfare of Latvia, Member of the Saeima.

Honorary fellows

Since 2015, the university has awarded honorary degrees (honoris causa) to notable individuals as part of their Annual Award “Freedom. Susceptibility. Competence.” ceremony.
The title of honorary confirms Turība University's recognition to person's merits which are for society and university's benefits, and it does not give any material or financial benefits. The title of honorary (honoris causa) is granted for life. The title of honorary can be withdrawn due to very serious reasons by a decision of the Constituent Assembly of Turība University.

Doctor honoris causa, Dr.h.c: Vaira Vīķe-Freiberga (Sixth President of Latvia and the first female President of Latvia. Currently serves as the president of Club of Madrid, the world's largest forum of former Heads of State and Government), the Latvian academician, physics chemist, science historian Jānis Stradiņš.

Professor honoris causa, Prof.h.c: Guntis Zemītis (Professor of Turība University), Aivars Endziņš, chairman of the Commission of development of legal environment of President, the member of Council of Europe Commission for Democracy through Law, Venice Commission, and the professor of Turība University.

Notable Alumnus/Alumna honoris causa like: Ināra Pētersone (former director general of Latvian Revenues and Customs Authority), Mārcis Liors Skadmanis  founder of World NGO Day - 27 February, for NGOs worldwide), Edgars Štelmahers (Chairman of SIA „New Rosme”), Guna Paidere, the main state notary of the Register of Enterprises of Latvia.

See also
 List of universities in Latvia

References

External links
 Official website

Business schools in Latvia
Educational institutions established in 1993
1993 establishments in Latvia